Yacine Diop (born 18 June 1995) is a Senegalese basketball player for Louisville and the Senegalese national team.

She participated at the 2018 FIBA Women's Basketball World Cup.

Pittsburgh and Louisville statistics

Source

References

1995 births
Living people
Forwards (basketball)
Louisville Cardinals women's basketball players
Pittsburgh Panthers women's basketball players
Senegalese expatriate basketball people in the United States
Senegalese women's basketball players
Basketball players from Dakar